In numerical analysis, Chebyshev nodes are specific real algebraic numbers, namely the roots of the Chebyshev polynomials of the first kind. They are often used as nodes in polynomial interpolation because the resulting interpolation polynomial minimizes the effect of Runge's phenomenon.

Definition

For a given positive integer n the Chebyshev nodes in the interval (−1, 1) are

These are the roots of the Chebyshev polynomial of the first kind of degree n. For nodes over an arbitrary interval [a, b] an affine transformation can be used:

Approximation

The Chebyshev nodes are important in approximation theory because they form a particularly good set of nodes for polynomial interpolation. Given a function ƒ on the interval  and  points  in that interval, the interpolation polynomial is that unique polynomial  of degree at most  which has value  at each point .

So it is logical to try to minimize

This product is a monic polynomial of degree n.  It may be shown that the maximum absolute value (maximum norm) of any such polynomial is bounded from below by 21−n.  This bound is attained by the scaled Chebyshev polynomials 21−n Tn, which are also monic. (Recall that |Tn(x)| ≤ 1 for x ∈ [−1, 1].) Therefore, when the interpolation nodes xi are the roots of Tn, the error satisfies

For an arbitrary interval [a, b] a change of variable shows that

Notes

References
.

Further reading
Burden, Richard L.; Faires, J. Douglas: Numerical Analysis, 8th ed., pages 503–512, .

Numerical analysis
Algebraic numbers